Morkůvky is  municipality and village in Břeclav District in the South Moravian Region of the Czech Republic. It has about 500 inhabitants.

Notable people
František Peřina (1911–2006), fighter pilot

References

Villages in Břeclav District
Moravian Slovakia